Stefan Ruthenbeck (born 19 April 1972) is a German football manager and former player who played as a defender. He last managed 1. FC Köln.

Playing career 
Ruthenbeck played for 1. FC Quadrath-Ichendorf, SpVgg Oberaußem-Fortuna, FV Rheinbrohl and TuS Mayen before starting his managerial career also in Tus Mayen.

Coaching career

Early career 
He managed TuS Mayen and SpVgg EGC Wirges before signed by VfR Aalen II as their manager and youth coordinator.

VfR Aalen 
On 14 Juni 2014, Ruthenbeck signed a contract with VfR Aalen until 2015.

Greuther Fürth 
Ruthenbeck was appointed as the head coach on 12 June 2015. He was sacked on 21 November 2016.

1. FC Köln 
Ruthenbeck was appointed as the new coach of 1. FC Köln on 3 December 2017. In April 2018, it was announced that his contract would not be renewed at the end of the 2018–19 campaign.

Personal life 
Ruthenbeck is married and has two daughters. He's an avid fan of heavy metal music.

References

External links 
Profile at scoreway.com

1972 births
German footballers
Association football defenders
German football managers
Living people
Footballers from Cologne
VfR Aalen managers
SpVgg Greuther Fürth managers
2. Bundesliga managers
Bundesliga managers
1. FC Köln managers
TuS Mayen players